Amador Aguiar (1904–1991) was the founder of Banco Bradesco. Amador was born in a poor family in São Paulo and had 12 siblings. He founded the company in 1943. Following his death, his widow had a court battle with his adopted daughters over the inheritance. The daughters Lia and Lina Aguiar eventually won the case and became billionaires.

References 

1904 births
1991 deaths
Brazilian business executives
People from São Paulo